Haloechinothrix is a genus from the family Pseudonocardiaceae.

References

Pseudonocardiales
Monotypic bacteria genera
Bacteria genera